Syncosmia xanthocomes is a moth in the family Geometridae. It is found in the north-eastern Himalayas, Burma and on Borneo and Bali.

The wings have a bone-white ground colour with dark brown fasciation.

References

Moths described in 1926
Eupitheciini